Cry Woman is a 2002 Chinese film directed by Liu Bingjian. It was Liu's third feature film and like his previous two films, Incense and Men and Women, Cry Woman was not given permission to screen in China.

Cry Woman stars the Beijing Opera star Liao Qin in her first film role.

Despite being banned in China, the film was screened at several international venues, including the Karlovy Vary International Film Festival held in the Czech Republic and in the Un Certain Regard section at the 2002 Cannes Film Festival.

Plot 
Wang Guixiang (Liao Qin) and her husband (Li Longjun) are a migrant couple living in Beijing. Wang is eking out a career selling unlicensed DVDs when disaster strikes and police confiscate her DVD stocks, and her husband is arrested after getting into a fight over a mahjong game. Forced to return to Guizhou, she meets an old boyfriend (Wei Xingkun), who suggests she take a job as a professional mourner. Surprisingly, Wang finds herself very good at her new job as a "cry woman" and soon discovers that her talents are very much in demand.

Cast 
 Liao Qin
 Li Longjun
 Wei Xingkun
 Wen Qing
 Zhu Jiayue

References

External links 

Cry Woman at the Chinese Movie Database
 Official Site (French release)

2002 films
2000s Mandarin-language films
Films set in Beijing
Films set in Guizhou
2002 comedy-drama films
Films directed by Liu Bingjian
Chinese comedy-drama films
2000s Chinese films